In Roman mythology, King Numitor of Alba Longa, was the maternal grandfather of Rome's founder and first king, Romulus, and his twin brother Remus.  He was the son of Procas, descendant of Aeneas the Trojan, and father of the twins' mother, Rhea Silvia, and Lausus.

In 794 BC Procas died and was meant to be succeeded by Numitor. Instead he was overthrown and removed from the kingdom by his brother, Amulius, who had no respect for his father's will or his brother's seniority. Amulius also murdered Numitor's sons, in an effort to remove power from his brother for himself.

Rhea Silvia was made a Vestal Virgin by Amulius rendering her unable to have children on pain of death; however, according to myth she was forcibly impregnated by the god Mars. Romulus and Remus overthrew Amulius and reinstated Numitor as king in 752 B.C .

Family tree

See also
Aeneid
The Golden Bough (mythology)

Notes

References

Kings of Alba Longa

Characters in Book VI of the Aeneid